Freadelpha confluens is a species of beetle in the family Cerambycidae. It was described by Harold in 1879. It is known from Tanzania, the Democratic Republic of the Congo, Angola, and Zambia.

Subspecies
 Freadelpha confluens confluens Harold, 1879
 Freadelpha confluens tanganjicae Breuning, 1978

References

Sternotomini
Beetles described in 1879